A clementine is a hybrid citrus fruit, a cross between a mandarin and an orange.

Clementine may also refer to:

Arts and entertainment

Fictional entities
 Clementine (given name)
 Clementine, Eddie Riggs' guitar in video game Brütal Legend

Film and television
 Clementine (2004 film), a South-Korean/American action film
 Clementine (2019 film), an American drama film
 Clémentine, a 1985 French animated TV series
 Clementine (The Walking Dead), a fictional character in The Walking Dead

Literature 
 Clementine (series), a series of children's books by Sara Pennypacker
 Clementine, a 1962 novel by Betsy Byars
 Clementine, a 2010 novel by Cherie Priest
 Clementine, a 1999 young-adult novel by Sophie Masson
 Writings by or ascribed to Pope Clement I (fl. 96), including:
 Clementine literature

Music 
 "Clementine" (Halsey song), 2019
 "Clementine" (Tom Lehrer song), 1959
 "Clementine" (Mark Owen song), 1997
 "Clementine", a song by Elliott Smith from the 1995 album Elliott Smith
 "Clementine", a song by The Decemberists from the 2002 album Castaways and Cutouts
 "Clementine", a song by Sarah Jaffe from the 2010 album Suburban Nature
 "Clementine", a song by Pink Martini from the 2004 album Hang On Little Tomato
 "Clementine", a song by Johnny Cash from the 1959 album Songs of Our Soil
 "O My Darling, Clementine", Gold Rush-era Western folk ballad

People
 Clementine (given name), a female given name including a list of people and fictional characters with the name
 Clementine (musician) (born 1976), a Filipino singer-songwriter and producer
 Clémentine (musician) (born 1963), a French singer-songwriter
 AJ Clementine, Australian model, writer, social media influencer, and transgender activist
 Benjamin Clementine (born 1988), English artist, composer and musician

Science and technology 
 Clementine (software), an audio player 
 Clementine, now SPSS Modeler, a data mining tool
 Clementine (nuclear reactor), at Los Alamos, U.S.
 Clémentine (satellite), a French satellite
 Clementine (spacecraft), an American uncrewed spacecraft
 "Clementine", a recovery craft of Project Azorian

Other uses
 Clementine, Missouri, place in the U.S.
 Clementine Maersk, a 2002 container ship

See also 

 Clement (disambiguation)
 "Oh My Darling, Clementine", an American western folk ballad